The Deputy Clerk of the Closet is the Domestic Chaplain to the Sovereign of the United Kingdom. The office was created in 1677. Since 1931, the Deputy Clerk is also the sub-dean of the Chapel Royal (under the Clerk of the Closet). The Deputy Clerk is the only full-time clerical member of the Ecclesiastical Household of the Monarch of the United Kingdom.

From 1746 until 1903 there were three Deputy Clerks. By 1923 there was only one.

List of Deputy Clerks of the Closet 
 Rev'd Canon Paul Wright, LVO 2015 – present
 Rev'd Prebendary Bill Scott, CVO 2007–2015
 Rev'd Prebendary William Booth, CVO 1991–2007
 Rev'd Canon Anthony Caesar, CVO 1979–1991
 Rev'd Canon James Mansel, KCVO 1965–1979
 Rev'd Maurice Foxell, KCVO 1948–1965
 Rev'd Wallace Elliott 1941–1948
 Rev'd Launcelot Percival, KCVO 1931–1941
 Very Rev'd Frederic William Farrar, KCVO 1894–1931 (re-appointed 1901)
 Rev'd Edgar Sheppard 1903–1910
 Rev'd Canon John Neale Dalton, KCVO 1897– (re-appointed 1901)
 Rev'd William Rowe Jolley, KCVO ca 1901–?
 Hugh Pearson 1881–
 Arthur Penrhyn Stanley 1863−1881
 John Merewether, Dean of Hereford 1837–1850
 Timothy Fish Foord-Bowes 1835–1837
 Frederick-William Blomberg 1827–1837
 Charles Richard Sumner 1824–1826 (afterwards Bishop of Llandaff)
 Robert James Carr 1821–1824(afterwards Bishop of Chichester)
 James Stanier Clarke 1816–1817
 Thomas Hughes 1808–1833
 William Cookson 1805–1820
 Edward Legge 1803–1805 (later Bishop of Oxford)
 Charles Moss 1800–1806 (afterwards Bishop of Oxford)
 Henry Majendie 1794–1800 (afterwards Bishop of Chester)
 William Arnald 1782–1787
 John Fisher 1781–1785
 William Buller 1764–1793 (afterwards Bishop of Exeter)
 Newton Ogle 1762–1781
 Charles Poyntz (1761–1808)
 Hon Frederick Keppel 1759–1762 (afterwards Bishop of Exeter)
 Edward Townshend 1748–1758
 Jonathan Shipley 1750–1760 (afterwards Dean of Winchester)
 Lord James Beauclerk 1745–1748 (afterwards Bishop of Hereford)
 John Head 1745–1760
 Robert Hay Drummond 1741–1748 (afterwards Bishop of St Asaph)
 Alured Clarke, Dean of Exeter 1734–1742
 Charles Naylor 1726–1738
 John Gilbert 1723–1738 (afterwards Bishop of Llandaff. Clerk of the Closet 1752–57)
 Gilbert Burnet 1723–1726
 Henry Egerton 1719–1723 (afterwards Bishop of Hereford. Clerk of the Closet 1735–46)
 ---? Talbot 1718–1723
 ---? Torriano 1716–1718
 William Wake 1689–
 J. Montague 1684–
 Nathaniel Crew 1667–

References 

 

Positions within the British Royal Household
Anglican ecclesiastical offices
1677 establishments in England